Piula Fa'asalele (born 1988) is a Samoan professional rugby union player. He currently plays at flanker for USAP in the Pro D2 (French's second division).

References

External links
Ligue Nationale De Rugby Profile
European Professional Club Rugby Profile

1988 births
Living people
Samoan rugby union players
Rugby union players from Wellington City
Stade Rochelais players
Castres Olympique players
Stade Toulousain players
Expatriate rugby union players in France
Samoan expatriate sportspeople in France
Samoan expatriate rugby union players
Rugby union flankers
Samoa international rugby union players